John Chandler (27 June 1924 – 13 July 2016) was a British sports shooter. He competed in the 50 m rifle event at the 1948 Summer Olympics. In November 2016 it was reported that Chandler had died aged 92.

References

1924 births
2016 deaths
Place of birth missing
British male sport shooters
Olympic shooters of Great Britain
Shooters at the 1948 Summer Olympics